Artem Volodymyrovych Malysh (born 15 July 2000) is a Ukrainian professional football goalkeeper who played for Inhulets Petrove.

Career

Early years
Malysh is a product of Dynamo Kyiv sportive school system, after the short period in the local Kovel youth school.

Inhulets Petrove
In August 2020 he was transferred to the Ukrainian Premier League débutant Inhulets Petrove and made his league debut on 21 February 2021, playing as a starting player in the home draw against Vorskla Poltava.

References

External links 
 
 

2000 births
Living people
People from Volyn Oblast
Ukrainian footballers
Association football goalkeepers
FC Dynamo Kyiv players
FC Inhulets Petrove players
Ukrainian Premier League players
Ukraine youth international footballers
Sportspeople from Volyn Oblast